The 2011–12 season was Udinese Calcio's 17th consecutive and 32nd Serie A season. The club had a successful league season, finishing third in Serie A, but disappointed in the three cup competitions in which it competed. Udinese were eliminated from the Coppa Italia in the round of 16, and also experienced disappointment in the UEFA Champions League, where it was eliminated in the play-off round and thus failed to make its first appearance in the group stage since the 2005–06 season. As a result, Udinese dropped down to the UEFA Europa League, where it successfully advanced from both the group stage and the round of 32, only to be eliminated in the round of 16. Club captain and legend Antonio Di Natale was once again the team's top scorer, with 23 goals in Serie A and 29 in total.

Season review

Serie A
Udinese were unbeaten in their first seven Serie A games, and only conceded one goal in that period, which was the best defensive record in top European leagues at the time. They were also top of Serie A at the moment, and compared to much more expensive squad of Manchester City, which also top Premier League at the same time.

Europe
Udinese were drawn against English side Arsenal for qualification into the UEFA Champions League. The first leg was played away at the Emirates Stadium, which resulted in a 1–0 defeat. The second leg was a heavily contested match, with Udinese taking a 1–0 lead at half-time to level the aggregate score to 1–1 but Arsenal caught up in the second half and Udinese lost 2–1, and 3–1 on aggregate. Udinese were then drawn into the Europa League.

Players

Squad information
Updated 31 August 2011

Reserve squad
The following reserve players received first team shirt number:

UEFA Champions League squad
Updated 8 August 2011
The squad consist of a maximum of 17 foreigners, and a minimum of 8 local trained players (must be a minimum of 4 club trained)

Note: Matěj Vydra replaced injured Maurizio Domizzi after the deadline

List B

UEFA Europa League squad
Updated 1 February 2012

Note:
Players marked * indicated that they were inserted the squad in January 2012
Players marked ** indicated that they left the squad in January 2012

List B

Transfers

Summer 2011

In

Total spending:  €14 million

Out

Total sale:  €64.25 million

Pre-season and friendlies

Competitions

Serie A

League table

Results summary

Results by round

Matches

Coppa Italia

UEFA Champions League

Play-off round

UEFA Europa League

Group stage

Knockout phase

Round of 32

Round of 16

Statistics

Appearances and goals

Note:
1. Moved to Atalanta on-loan before Serie-A begins.

Goalscorers

References

Udinese Calcio seasons
Udinese
Udinese
Udinese